Bath Township is one of 13 townships in Franklin County, Indiana. As of the 2010 census, its population was 369.

History
The name of Bath is probably derived from local mineral springs said to hold medicinal qualities.

Geography

Unincorporated towns
 Bath
 Mixersville
 Old Bath
(This list is based on USGS data and may include former settlements.)

Cemeteries
The township contains one cemetery, Bethlehem.

References
 
 United States Census Bureau cartographic boundary files

External links
 Indiana Township Association
 United Township Association of Indiana

Townships in Franklin County, Indiana
Townships in Indiana